In enzymology, a coniferyl-alcohol glucosyltransferase is an enzyme that catalyzes the chemical reaction

UDP-glucose + coniferyl alcohol  UDP + coniferin

Thus, the two substrates of this enzyme are UDP-glucose and coniferyl alcohol, whereas its two products are UDP and coniferin.

This enzyme belongs to the family of glycosyltransferases, specifically the hexosyltransferases.  The systematic name of this enzyme class is UDP-glucose:coniferyl-alcohol 4'-beta-D-glucosyltransferase. Other names in common use include uridine diphosphoglucose-coniferyl alcohol glucosyltransferase, and UDP-glucose coniferyl alcohol glucosyltransferase.  This enzyme participates in phenylpropanoid biosynthesis.

References 

 

EC 2.4.1
Enzymes of unknown structure
Phenylpropanoids metabolism